

Bra-Bre  

Branchamin 4%
Brasofensine (INN)
Bravelle
Brazergoline (INN)
Breathtek UBT
Brecanavir (INN, INN)
Breezee Mist Antifungal
Brefonalol (INN)
Bremazocine (INN)
Bremelanotide (USAN, INN)
Brentuximab vedotin (USAN)
Brequinar (INN)
Bretazenil (INN)
Brethaire
Brethine
Bretylium tosilate (INN)
Bretylol
Brevibloc
Brevicon
Brevital Sodium
Brevoxyl
Brexidol 20

Bri  

Briakinumab (USAN, INN)
Brian Care
Bricanyl
Brifentanil (INN)
Brimonidine (INN)
Brinase (INN)
Brinazarone (INN)
Brindoxime (INN)
Brinzolamide (INN)
Briobacept (USAN, INN)
Brioschi
Bristacycline
Bristagen
Bristamycin
Brivanib alaninate (USAN, INN)
Brivaracetam (USAN, INN)
Brivudine (INN)

Bro

Brob-Brol 

Brobactam (INN)
Broclepride (INN)
Brocresine (INN)
Brocrinat (INN)
Brodalumab (USAN, INN)
Brodimoprim (INN)
Brodspec
Brofaromine (INN)
Brofed
Brofezil (INN)
Brofoxine (INN)
Brolaconazole (INN)
Brolamfetamine (INN)

Brom

Broma-Bromo 

Bromacrylide (INN)
Bromadoline (INN)
Bromaline Elixir
Bromamide (INN)
Bromanate
Bromanyl
Bromarest
Bromatapp
Bromazepam (INN)
Bromazine (INN)
Brombay
Bromchlorenone (INN)
Bromebric acid (INN)
Bromelains (INN)
Bromerguride (INN)
Brometenamine (INN)
Bromfed-DM
Bromfenac (INN)
Bromfenex
Bromhexine (INN)
Bromindione (INN)
Bromisoval (INN)
Bromociclen (INN)
Bromocriptine (INN)
Bromofenofos (INN)
Bromofos (INN)
Bromopride (INN)
Bromoxanide (INN)

Bromp  

Bromperidol (INN)
Bromphen
Brompheniramine (INN)
Brompheril

Bron-Brox  

Broncho Saline
Bronitin Mist
Bronkaid Mist
Bronkaid
Bronkephrine
Bronkodyl
Bronkometer
Bronkosol
Bronopol (INN)
Brontex
Broparestrol (INN)
Broperamole (INN)
Bropirimine (INN)
Broquinaldol (INN)
Brosotamide (INN)
Brosuximide (INN)
Brotame
Brotianide (INN)
Brotizolam (INN)
Brovanexine (INN)
Brovincamine (INN)
Broxaldine (INN)
Broxaterol (INN)
Broxitalamic acid (INN)
Broxuridine (INN)
Broxyquinoline (INN)

Bry  

Bryrel